William Wright (May 21, 1918, or 1932 – October 28, 1991) was an American singer. He is considered one of Little Richard's greatest influences in his formative years.

Biography
Wright was born in Atlanta, Georgia. There is uncertainty over his year of birth. He claimed to have been born in 1932, but the researchers Bob Eagle and Eric LeBlanc have stated that he was born in 1918, on the basis of official records and a newspaper obituary; other sources suggest 1928.

As a child, Wright excelled at singing gospel music in his local church. In his youth, he worked as a dancer and as a female impersonator but developed as a singer when he began performing at Atlanta's 81 Theater. The saxophonist Paul "Hucklebuck" Williams saw Wright's performance when the two shared a bill with Charles Brown and Wynonie Harris. Williams recommended him to Herman Lubinsky of Savoy Records.

His first record, "Blues for My Baby", recorded with Howard Collander's orchestra, rose to number 3 on the Billboard R&B chart in 1949. He had three more records on the R&B chart: "You Satisfy" (number 9, 1949), "Stacked Deck" (number 9, 1951), and "Hey, Little Girl" (number 10, 1951). A flamboyant performer, he was known as the "Prince of the Blues" throughout his career. He was a key figure in Atlanta blues after World War II and had a major influence on the rock-and-roll pioneer Little Richard, whom he helped get his first recording contract in 1951. In the early 1950s, the openly gay Wright also helped in establishing Richard's look, advising him to use pancake makeup on his face and wear his hair in a long-haired pompadour style similar to his.

In 1954, Wright signed a contract with Peacock Records, owned by Don Robey, in Houston, Texas. He made his last recordings in 1959. He primarily worked as an MC in Atlanta but continued to perform until he suffered a stroke. He died of a pulmonary embolism just before his 1991 Halloween show at the Royal Peacock in Atlanta.

Discography

Singles
"Blues for My Baby" / "You Satisfy" (Savoy 710), 11/1949
"Man’s Brand Boogie" / "Beg-a-Dog" (Atlanta 6000), 1950
"I Keep Drinkin'" / "Billy’s Boogie Blues" (Savoy 715),1950
"Back Biting Woman" / "Thinkin' Blues" (Savoy 733), 1950
"After Dark Blues" / "Heavy Hearted Blues" (Savoy 741), 1951
"'Fore Day Blues" / "Empty Hands" (Savoy 761), 1951
"Mean Old Wine" / "Keep Your Hands on Your Heart" (Savoy 776), 11/1951
"Stacked Deck" / "Mercy Mercy" (Savoy 781), 1951
"Hey Little Girl" / "Gotta Find My Baby" (Savoy 810), 1951
"New Kind of Lovin'" / "When the Wagon Comes" (Savoy 819), 1952
"Turn Your Lamps Down Low" / "Drinkin' and Thinkin'" (Savoy 827), 1952
"Married Woman’s Boogie" / "Every Evening" (Savoy 837), 1952
"If I Didn’t Love You" / "Goin' Down Slow" (Savoy 870), 12/1952
"" / "Four Cold Cold Walls" (Savoy 1100), 5/1953
"Live the Life" / "I Remember" (Savoy 1127), 4/1954
"Bad Luck, Heartaches, and Trouble" / "The Question" (Peacock 1657), 7/1955
"Have Mercy Baby" / "I Love You Sweetheart" (Carrollton 801), 1959

Other recordings
"Walking the Blues" (Savoy), unreleased, 9/23/1949
"Ride on Little Girl" (Savoy), unreleased, 1/7/1950
"Misfortune Blues" (Savoy), unreleased, 4/24/1950
"Restless Blues" (Savoy), unreleased, 1951 (included on Savoy LP-1146)
"This Love of Mine" (Savoy), unreleased, 1951 (included on Savoy LP-1146)
"If I Had My Life to Live Over" (Savoy), unreleased, 1952 (included on Savoy LP-1146)
"Sad Hour Blues" (Savoy), unreleased, 1952 (included on Savoy LP-1146)
"Do Something for Me", recorded live at the Harlem Theater, Atlanta, Georgia, 1952 (included on the album Stacked Deck)
"Keep Your Hand on Your Heart and Your Mind on Me" (Savoy), 1953 (included on Savoy LP-2255)
"Will You Need Me" (Savoy), unreleased, 1954 (included on Savoy LP-1146)
"Baby Don't You Want a Man Like Me" (Peacock), unreleased, 1955
"Let's Be Friends" (Peacock), unreleased, 1955
 Titles unknown (Fury/Fire), unreleased, 1959

Albums
Stacked Deck (Route 66), 1980
Goin Down Slow (Savoy LP-1146), 1984
Various artists, Southern Blues: Roots of Rock and Roll Volume 11 (Savoy LP-2255), 1985
Billy Wright/Little Richard: Baby Don’t You Want a Man Like Me (Ace 193), 1987
Billy Wright (Savoy Jazz), 1994
Classics 1949-1951 (Melodie Jazz Classics), 2003
Billy Wright (Savoy Jazz), 1994
Have Mercy Baby (Blue City BCCD-810), including his Peacock, Carrollton, and Atlanta recordings

References

External links
 [  Allmusic on Billy Wright]

1932 births
1991 deaths
American blues singers
American gay musicians
LGBT African Americans
Savoy Records artists
Musicians from Atlanta
Deaths from pulmonary embolism
Burials at South-View Cemetery
20th-century LGBT people
20th-century African-American male singers
African-American drag queens